Hibbertia villosa is a species of flowering plant in the family Dilleniaceae and is endemic to northern New South Wales. It is an erect shrub with hairy branches and leaves, spatula-shaped to narrow egg-shaped leaves with the narrower end towards the base and yellow flowers with fifteen to twenty stamens in three groups arranged around three carpels.

Description
There are usually fifteen to twenty stamens arranged in three groups around three glabrous carpels. Flowering occurs from August to November.

Taxonomy
Hibbertia villosa was first formally described in 1990 by Barry Conn in the journal Muelleria from specimens collected in the Gibraltar Range National Park in 1974.

Distribution and habitat
This hibbertia grows in open forest from the Gibraltar Range National Park to Werrikimbe National Park in northern New South Wales.

References

villosa
Flora of New South Wales
Plants described in 1990
Taxa named by Barry John Conn